PVT Chat is a 2020 erotic drama film, written and directed by Ben Hozie. It stars Peter Vack as an online gambler who becomes obsessed with a cam girl played by Julia Fox. PVT Chat premiered at the Fantasia International Film Festival on August 21, 2020.

Plot
Jack is an internet gambler who lives in New York and becomes obsessed with Scarlet, a cam girl from San Francisco. His obsession reaches a boiling point when fantasy materializes into reality after Jack spots Scarlet on a rainy street in Chinatown.

Cast
The cast include:
 Julia Fox as Scarlett
 Peter Vack as Jack
 Buddy Duress as Larry
 Dasha Nekrasova as QT4U
 Heather Allison as Gorgeous_357
 Nikki Belfiglio as Emma
 Austin Brown as himself
 Atticus Cain as Henry the Landlord
 Michelle Chu as Cam Girl
 Andrew Clark as Gallery bartender
 Oliver David as Drone Operator
 Ally Davis as Venus

Production

Filming
The film was shot the last week of January through mid-February 2018 in New York City (Brooklyn, Queens, and Manhattan).

Release
The film had its world premiere at the 2020 Fantasia International Film Festival. Distribution rights for United Kingdom and Ireland were acquired by Vertigo Releasing in November 17, 2020. Dark Star Pictures released the film in available theaters on February 5, 2021, followed by a VOD and Digital HD release on February 9, 2021.

Reception
The review aggregator Rotten Tomatoes gives the film a 63% approval rating based on 41 reviews, with an average rating of 6.10/10. The website's critics consensus reads: "Its intelligent and nuanced approach to potentially salacious material is refreshing, but PVT Chat struggles to use it in service of a meaningful story." According to Metacritic, which sampled nine critics and calculated a weighted average score of 61 out of 100, the film received "generally favorable reviews".

References

External links
 
 
 

2020 drama films
American erotic drama films
2020s erotic drama films
2020s English-language films
2020s American films